The Flying Fifty-Five is a 1924 British silent sports film directed by A. E. Coleby and starring Lionelle Howard, Frank Perfitt and Lionel d'Aragon. It is based on a 1922 novel of the same title by Edgar Wallace, and was remade as a sound film in 1939.

Cast
 Lionelle Howard as Reggie Cambrey  
 Stephanie Stephens as Stella Barrington 
 Brian B. Lemon as Lord Fountwell  
 Frank Perfitt as Joanh Urquhart  
 Lionel d'Aragon as Sir Jacques Gregory  
 Bert Darley as Honourable Claude Barrington  
 Adeline Hayden Coffin as Aunt 
 John Alexander as Jebson  
 Johnny Butt 
 Annie Esmond

Further reading 

 Low, Rachael. The History of the British Film 1918-1929. George Allen & Unwin, 1971.

References

External links
 

1924 films
1920s sports films
British horse racing films
British silent feature films
Films directed by A. E. Coleby
Films set in England
Films based on British novels
Films based on works by Edgar Wallace
Stoll Pictures films
British black-and-white films
1920s English-language films
1920s British films
Silent sports films